Seven Days to Noon is a 1950 British drama/thriller film directed by John and Roy Boulting. Paul Dehn and James Bernard won the Academy Award for Best Story for their work on the film.

Plot
In 1950, the British Prime Minister receives a letter from a man who says he has stolen a nuclear weapon and will destroy the centre of London next Sunday at noon, unless the British government declares that the country is going to stop making such devices. The letter is signed "Professor Willingdon", which is the name of the senior researcher at Britain's atomic weapons development facility, the Wallingford Research Centre, so, on Monday, Detective Superintendent Folland of Scotland Yard's Special Branch is charged with investigating whether the letter is a fraud or represents a genuine threat.

At the Research Centre, Folland finds that Willingdon has gone missing, as has a UR12 nuclear bomb, which is small enough and light enough for an individual to carry. He recruits Stephen Lane, Willingdon's assistant, to help with the search, and they go to Willingdon's house. Neither Lane, nor Willingdon's wife or daughter, Ann, had noticed anything unusual in the Professor's recent behavior, but troubling notes are found among his papers which, coupled with some remarks he made to the local vicar, who is the last person known to have spoken with Willingdon, indicate he had come to believe that his life's work was being used by the government for evil purposes.

On Tuesday, Willingdon, who is carrying the bomb around with him in a Gladstone bag, sees his picture in the newspaper (though it is not stated why he is wanted), so he has a barber shave off his moustache before looking for a place to stay. He rents a room from Mrs Peckett, but spooks her by pacing around his room all night. After he has left the next morning, she sees an article about the hunt for someone who is killing landladies, so she calls the police. A quick-thinking constable realises the description matches Willingdon, and a car is sent to the boardinghouse. Willingdon returns, but he sees the police car parked outside the building and is able to make a quiet getaway.

Willingdon throws away his overcoat and goes to a pawn shop to buy another one. There, he meets Goldie, an actress whose best days are behind her, and her dog, Trixie. The trio are reunited that evening when Trixie gets away from Goldie and leads her to Willingdon. They go to a pub and, when it closes for the night, Goldie invites Willingdon to her apartment, as he has no lodgings. He sleeps on her spare bed and leaves before she wakes up in the morning.

The recent unscheduled Cabinet meetings and indications of an impending mass mobilisation have not gone unnoticed by the press. By Thursday, rumours of war are circulating and there is a growing crowd outside 10 Downing Street, so the Prime Minister decides to finally make a statement over the radio. He reveals the threat and announces an evacuation of the 12 square miles around Parliament, to begin the next morning. When this is complete Army units will begin a search of central London, beginning at the edge of the evancuation area and moving toward the centre.

Goldie sees one of the increasing number of posters with Willingdon's face on it and goes to the police. When she gets home, she finds Willingdon waiting for her—the ever-intensifying search has made him nervous, so he has decided to hold Goldie hostage in her apartment, saying he will blow up the bomb prematurely if she calls for help.

The evacuation (of people, as well as important cultural artifacts) proceeds smoothly. When the systematic military search reaches Goldie's street on Saturday night, Willingdon escapes out a window. Shortly before noon on Sunday, he is found, praying in a church that was destroyed during The Blitz. Folland and Lane rush over, bringing Ann to try to talk Willingdon out of his plan. He says it is too late to change his mind, but she sees his bag across the room and calls for help. Willingdon is restrained and Lane begins to defuse the bomb. Screaming that it is "Too late", Willingdon breaks free, runs from the church, and is killed by a nervous soldier. As the clock strikes twelve, Lane finishes disarming the UR12. Goldie, who is on Westminster Bridge attempting to hitch a ride to Aldershot hears the all-clear sirens and heads for home.

Main cast

Barry Jones as Professor John Willingdon
Olive Sloane as Goldie Phillips
André Morell as Superintendent Folland
Sheila Manahan as Ann Willingdon, Professor Willingdon's daughter
Hugh Cross as Stephen 'Steve' Lane
Joan Hickson as Mrs Emily Georgina Peckett, a landlady
Ronald Adam as Honorable Arthur Lytton, the Prime Minister
Marie Ney as Mrs Willingdon, Professor Willingdon's wife
Wyndham Goldie as Reverend Burgess, the vicar of Wallingford
Russell Waters as Detective Davis
Martin Boddey as General Willoughby
Frederick Allen as himself, a BBC radio announcer
Victor Maddern as Private Jackson
Geoffrey Keen as Alf, the loudmouth in the pub
Merrill Mueller as himself, the American NBC radio commentator in London
Joss Ackland as Young Policeman at the Police Station (uncredited)
Jean Anderson as Mother at Railway Station (uncredited)
Ernest Clark as Barber (uncredited)
Colin Douglas as Soldier in House Search (uncredited)
Sam Kydd as Soldier in House Search (uncredited)
Bruce Seton as Brigadier Grant (uncredited)
Marianne Stone as Woman in Phone Box (uncredited)
Ian Wilson as Sandwich-Board Man (uncredited)

Production
The film was based on a story by journalist Paul Dehn and musician James Benard, neither of whom was a screenwriter at the time. Roy Boulting produced, while John directed and Roy edited (though, in the credits of the film, both brothers are credited with performing all three tasks). The brothers described the story as "Guy Fawkes in modern dress", and deliberately did not cast any stars in the leads, as they felt the story would be more believable that way. During filming, John Boulting said: "We don't want any stars. They would be a positive hindrance. Those old familiar faces, and old familiar tricks and gestures, would entirely destroy the illusion we have created. Only my brother and I know the full story of Seven Days to Noon. Even our players haven't seen the entire script. We're keeping it secret until it's ready for sale."

Production began in July 1949, with the cooperation of the War Office and the police. Location filming took place in London over several weeks, including at Westminster Bridge, Lambeth Grove, and Trafalgar Square Underground station; walkie-talkies were used to help control traffic on the bridge. For the film, Gilbert Taylor was influenced by the photography of The Naked City.

Reception and awards

Box office
The film performed reasonably well at the box office. It was one of a string of financially successful films from Alexander Korda's production and distribution companies following a series of flops (other hits from 1950 included State Secret, The Happiest Days of Your Life and Odette).

Awards
The film received the Academy Award for Best Story at the 24th Academy Awards, which were held in 1952 at the RKO Pantages Theatre.

Sequel
André Morell portrayed Superintendent Folland again in High Treason, a film directed by Roy Boulting in 1951.

DVD release
Seven Days to Noon became available on DVD in 2008.

See also
List of fictional prime ministers of the United Kingdom

Notes

References

Bibliography
The Great British Films, pp 144–146, Jerry Vermilye, 1978, Citadel Press,

External links

 
 
 

Review of film at DVD Savant
Review of film at Variety
Seven Days at Noon at BFI Screenonline

1950 films
1950 drama films
1950s psychological thriller films
British black-and-white films
British thriller drama films
Apocalyptic films
1950s English-language films
British political thriller films
Films directed by John Boulting
Films directed by Roy Boulting
Films about nuclear war and weapons
Films based on books
Films scored by John Addison
Films set in the 1950s
Films set in London
Films that won the Academy Award for Best Story
Films with screenplays by Paul Dehn
1950s British films